William Rogers McIntyre,  (March 15, 1918 – June 14, 2009) was a Canadian Puisne Justice of the Supreme Court of Canada.

Born in Lachine, Quebec, the son of Charles Sidney McIntyre and Pauline May Sifton, he moved with his family to Moose Jaw, Saskatchewan when he was young. In 1939, he received a Bachelor of Arts degree from the University of Saskatchewan. After serving during World War II, he received his Bachelor of Laws in 1946 from University of Saskatchewan.

In 1947, he was called to the Bars of Saskatchewan and British Columbia and practiced law in Victoria, British Columbia.

In 1967, he was appointed to the Supreme Court of British Columbia and elevated to the British Columbia Court of Appeal in 1973. In 1979, he was appointed to the Supreme Court of Canada and retired in 1989. In 1991, he was made a Companion of the Order of Canada.

Death
McIntyre died in Victoria, British Columbia from throat cancer, aged 91, on June 14, 2009.

External links
 
 Obituary - University of Alberta Faculty of Law
 Obituary - The Globe and Mail

1918 births
2009 deaths
Lawyers in British Columbia
Judges in British Columbia
Deaths from cancer in British Columbia
Canadian military personnel of World War II
Companions of the Order of Canada
Deaths from esophageal cancer
Justices of the Supreme Court of Canada
People from Victoria, British Columbia
People from Moose Jaw
University of Saskatchewan alumni
People from Lachine, Quebec
University of Saskatchewan College of Law alumni